The haladie is a double-edged dagger from ancient Syria and India, consisting of two curved blades, each approximately  in length, attached to a single hilt.

The weapon was used by warriors of the Indian Rajput clans, and was both a stabbing and slicing blade. Some haladie had spikes on one side of the handle in the style of a knuckle duster, while others had a third blade in this position. In some cases the main blades would be serrated.

The haladie is believed to be one of the world's first triple-edged blades.

See also
Willow Leaf Knives are two sided throwing knives that can be curved or straight. Designed exclusively for ranged combat they look almost like haladie without the handle.

References

Daggers
Rajput culture